Cornwell is a small village and civil parish about  west of Chipping Norton in the West Oxfordshire district of Oxfordshire, near the county border with Gloucestershire. The 2001 Census recorded the parish's population as 66.

Manor
Cornwell was listed in the Domesday Book of 1096 as "Cornewelle" in the ancient hundred of Shipton.
The manor house dates from the 16th or 17th century, with a dining room and library panelled in about 1640 and 17th century stables and dovecote. It was the home of Sir Thomas Penyston, 1st Baronet and his family occupied the house until the 19th century. A new front was built onto the house in about 1750, and the drawing room has a fireplace in the style of Robert Adam. In 1939 the architect Clough Williams-Ellis, who had designed Portmeirion in north Wales, restored the house, added a ballroom and laid out the gardens. The house is a Grade II* listed building.

Parish church

The Church of England parish church of Saint Peter was originally Norman, and the chancel arch survives from this time. Most of the windows are Decorated Gothic and Perpendicular Gothic additions. The church was rebuilt in 1830 and 1882, when the present west window was added. The south door has a porch with a sundial.  The church is a Grade II* listed building.  The church is part of the parish of Little Compton, along with the churches of Chastleton, Daylesford and Little Rollright. The parish is part of the Team Benefice of Chipping Norton, along with the parishes of Chipping Norton with Over Norton, Churchill and Kingham.

Economic and social history
Some of the cottages in the village are 17th century. In 1939 Williams-Ellis remodelled all the cottages in Cornwell and remodelled the former village school in neo-Georgian style as the village hall.

References

Sources

External links

Civil parishes in Oxfordshire
Villages in Oxfordshire
West Oxfordshire District